Mirza Michael John Bukht  (10 September 1941 – 4 August 2011) was a British commercial radio executive. Under the pseudonym Michael Barry, he was a chef and television personality who was a regular co-presenter on the BBC2 television show Food and Drink. He was appointed an Officer of the Order of the British Empire (OBE) in the 1996 Birthday Honours "for services to Radio and Television Broadcasting."

Education and background
Barry was educated at The Haberdashers' Aske's Boys' School and at King's College London (BA). His father was a Pakistani diplomat while his mother was from Southern Wales.

Career
From 1973 to 1997 he was the Programme controller for Capital Radio, GWR Group Radio, Classic FM, Jamaica Broadcasting and the Principal of the National Broadcasting School. The first programme controller of Capital Radio and of Classic FM (the format of which he devised), he had also worked for Kent's Invicta FM.

He spent time during the early 1980s on the Wild Coast of the now defunct Republic of Transkei, setting up the now defunct Capital Radio 604, where he moonlighted as the Capital Crafty Cook. He was regarded by those South African broadcasters who worked under his tutelage as having mentored a generation of highly professional radio presenters. Inane patter was his nemesis. His mantra: "If you've nothing to say, segway!" In 1997 he gave up his full-time work with Classic FM because of a stress-related illness.

He was perhaps best known by the general public as a regular co-presenter on the BBC2 television show Food and Drink in the late 1980s and 1990s, where he was the series' regular chef. He was sometimes known as 'The Crafty Cook' for his frequent use of the adjective 'crafty' to describe his cooking technique. He wrote several books on cooking, including Michael Barry's Food and Drink Cookbook.

He was a Fellow of The Radio Academy, and lived in Kent.

Bukht died on 4 August 2011, after suffering for some time from ill health, survived by his partner Jennie Jones, his son and his three daughters.

References

External links
Profile at MediaUK
Obituary in The Independent
Obituary in The Telegraph

1941 births
2011 deaths
Alumni of King's College London
English Muslims
People educated at Haberdashers' Boys' School
BBC television presenters
English television chefs
English people of Pakistani descent
English people of Welsh descent
British radio executives
British people of Pakistani descent
Officers of the Order of the British Empire
Capital (radio network)
Classic FM (UK)